Antoine Boësset, Antoine Boesset or Anthoine de Boesset (1586 – 8 December 1643), sieur de Villedieu, was the superintendent of music at the Ancien Régime French court and a composer of secular music, particularly airs de cour.  He and his father-in-law Pierre Guédron dominated the court's musical life for the first half of the 17th century under Louis XIII. His son Jean-Baptiste [de] Boesset, sieur de Dehault, composed church music.

Life
Born at Blois and baptised there on 24 February 1587, he was made master of the children within the musical household of the Chambre du roi in 1613. He rose to be the queen's music master in 1617 and secretary to the Chambre du roi in 1620, and finally surintendant of the musical household of the Chambre du roi in 1623 – in the last of these roles he succeeded Guédron (surintendant under Henry IV and Louis XIII), whose daughter he married in 1613. In 1632 he was conseiller and maître d'hôtel ordinaire du roi. He then held all these posts simultaneously until his death.

At the court he got to know Descartes, Mersenne and Huygens. Around 1640 Mersenne arranged a contest between Boësset and the Dutch Catholic priest Joan Albert Ban to set Germain Habert's poem "Me veux-tu voir mourir", but altered the poem's first line and thus its sense in the copy sent to Boësset – this influenced the setting and allowed Boësset to easily win the competition (Mersenne had already criticised Ban's work as boring and trivial). Boësset was also one of the forerunners of the basso continuo in France.  He died in Paris.

Works
9 Livres d'airs de cour (Books of airs de cour) for 4 and 5 voices (1617–1642 ; republished 1689)
Dozens of airs de cour for voice and lute (in anthologies published by Ballard)
Many ballets (1614-1639)
3 masses, 5 motets and a Magnificat

A critical edition of the airs de cour is being prepared by the Centre de Musique Baroque de Versailles (http://www.cmbv.com).

Bibliography
Julie Anne Sadie, Christopher Hogwood, Companion to Baroque Music
Caswell A. B., The Development of Seventeenth-Century French Vocal Ornamentation and its Influence upon Late Baroque Ornamentation Practice (thèse). University of Minnesota 1964
 Cauchie M., La dynastie des Boesset. In "Bulletin de la Société française de musicologie" (4, 6) 1920, p. 13-26
Cohen A., A Study of Notational and Performance Problems of an Early Air de cour : Je voudrois bien, ô Cloris (1629) by Antoine Boësset (c 1586–1643). In  E. Borroff (éd.), «Notations and Editions : a Book in Honor of Louise Cuyler», Dubuque (Ia.) 1974, p. 55-68
 Durosoir G., L'Air de cour en France: 1571–1655. Liège 1991
 Prunières Henri, Le ballet de cour en France avant Benserade et Lully. Paris 1914
 Verchaly A. (ed), Airs de cour pour voix et luth. Paris 1961
 —, La poésie française baroque et sa musique (1580–1645). Actes des journées internationales d'étude du Baroque III : Montauban 1968, p. 127-136
 —, A propos du récit français au début du XVIIe siècle. In "Recherches sur la musique française classique" (15) 1975, p. 39-46

References

External links
 
 Listings at Gallica

French male classical composers
French Baroque composers
French ballet composers
French musicians
17th-century French people
People from Blois
1586 births
1643 deaths
17th-century classical composers
17th-century male musicians